Chansons hivernales ( Winter Songs) is the eleventh studio and first Christmas album by Canadian singer Pierre Lapointe, released through Audiogram on November 20, 2020. It was produced by Emmanuel Éthier. The album debuted at number 10 on the Canadian Albums Chart in the issue dated December 5, 2020.

Background
Lapointe told Apple Music that he had "been wanting to do a Christmas album for 15 years" but that "people raised their eyebrows when I told them about the project". He further explained that the songs explore the "bittersweet lightness of the holiday season".

Critical reception
Reviewing the album for La Presse, Josée Lapointe called the album a "nice gift" from Pierre Lapointe, describing it as "full of joyful winks and with just enough sadness and nostalgia, which should pleasantly furnish our cold winter evenings".

Track listing

Charts

References

2020 Christmas albums
Audiogram (label) albums
French-language albums
Pierre Lapointe albums